The Denmark Hill Insect Bed is a Triassic fossil locality in the Denmark Hill Conservation Park of Ipswich, Queensland, Australia.

Description 
It belongs to the Blackstone Formation (Ipswich Coal Measures Group) dated to the Carnian age (228.0 - 216.5 million years ago).

The fossiliferous layer is located in between the Bluff coal seam and the Aberdare coal seam. The existence of coal seams above and below the layer indicates that it may have once been a lake (lacustrine environment).

The site is noted as a source of well-preserved insect fossils.

See also 
 List of fossil sites
 Chañares Formation, fossiliferous formation of the Ischigualasto-Villa Unión Basin, Argentina
 Ischigualasto Formation, contemporaneous fossiliferous formation of the Ischigualasto-Villa Unión Basin
 Molteno Formation, contemporaneous fossiliferous formation of Lesotho and South Africa
 Pebbly Arkose Formation, contemporaneous fossiliferous formation of Botswana, Zambia and Zimbabwe

References 

Geologic formations of Australia
Triassic Australia
Carnian Stage
Shale formations
Lacustrine deposits
Mesozoic paleontological sites of Australia
Triassic paleontological sites
Paleontology in Queensland
Ipswich, Queensland
1890 in paleontology